San Salvo Marina   is a frazione of San Salvo, located in the Province of Chieti - Abruzzo region of Italy.  

Frazioni of the Province of Chieti